São Miguel Paulista may refer to:
 Subprefecture of São Miguel Paulista, a subprefectures of the city of São Paulo, Brazil
 São Miguel Paulista (district of São Paulo)
 Roman Catholic Diocese of São Miguel Paulista, a diocese in the district of São Miguel Paulista